Arum hygrophilum is a species of flowering plant in the family Araceae. It has a disjunct distribution, found in Israel, Jordan, Lebanon, Syria, Cyprus and Morocco.

It is threatened by agricultural development and urbanization. The species has a white inner spathe, which has purple accents. The small spadix is a dark purple color.

References

hygrophilum
Near threatened plants
Flora of Morocco
Flora of Western Asia
Plants described in 1854
Flora of Lebanon
Taxa named by Pierre Edmond Boissier